Leo Fafard is a Canadian actor, driver and technical crew known for playing Lou Garou in WolfCop (2014) and Another WolfCop (2017).

Career 
In 2010, Leo Fafard was shooting a music video for a band in Saskatchewan called Rah Rah, where he played a werewolf in their video for song called "Henry." Lowell Dean was the director and by the end of the shoot he asked Leo would he like to be involved with a project called Wolfcop.

Filmography

Actor

References

External links

Living people
21st-century Canadian male actors
1972 births